El Monasterio de los Buitres (English: "The Monastery of the Vultures") is a Mexican motion picture categorized as religious drama. It was filmed in 1973.

Synopsis  
In an old monastery in Mexico, the faith of all the young aspiring priests is tested by the Father Prior using psychoanalysis. During the process, the young men manifested indecision, sexual problems (as incest or homosexuality) and lack of faith.

Cast 
 Enrique Lizalde as Father Prior
 Enrique Álvarez Félix as Emilio
 Irma Serrano as Amalia
 Augusto Benedico as Pablo
 Enrique Rocha as Andres
 Héctor Bonilla as Marcos
 Otto Sirgo as Juan
 Eduardo Noriega as Don Manuel
 David Estuardo as Antonio
 Jose Chávez as Camilo
 Carlos Cámara
 Margarita de la Fuente as Carmen

References

External links 
 

1973 films
Mexican drama films
1970s Spanish-language films
1973 drama films
Films directed by Francisco del Villar
1970s Mexican films